"O.U. (Gone, Gone)" is a song written and released by British pop band Pulp in 1992. Recorded with producer and former Pulp member Simon Hinkler, "O.U." would be the band's first single with Gift Records, with whom the band signed after conflicting with indie label Fire.

"O.U. (Gone, Gone)" did not chart in the UK, though it did attract positive reception from music critics. The song was later included on the compilation album Intro – The Gift Recordings in 1993.

Background
During the sessions that produced "O.U.", an early version of "Babies" was recorded, but it was passed over for single release at the time. Hinkler recalled, "I always thought 'Babies' should have been the A-side. It's so obviously the single from that session, whereas 'O.U.' was probably the worst of the bunch. Jarvis enjoyed being difficult about such things."

"O.U." was the first single released by the band on their new label, Gift Records. The band had conflicted with their old label, Fire Records. Cocker recalled,

Lyrically, the song was described by Sian Pattenden of the NME as "about train stations."

Release and reception
"O.U." was released as a single in June 1992. The single included the song "Space" on the B-side. Though neither song would be released on a Pulp studio album, both songs appeared on the compilation Intro – The Gift Recordings in 1993.

Stephen Thomas Erlewine of AllMusic wrote that the song demonstrated "the band's knack for creating terrific pop singles [that] prevents them from being too pretentious." Stuart Maconie of Select Magazine named the song, alongside the band's other Gift Records singles, as "funny, endearing and sometimes slightly nightmarish."

Track listing 
All songs written and composed by Jarvis Cocker, Russell Senior, Steve Mackey, Nick Banks and Candida Doyle.
CD single
"O.U. (Gone, Gone)" (radio edit) – 2:56
"O.U. (Gone, Gone)" (12" mix) – 3:34
"Space" – 5:13

12" vinyl
"O.U. (Gone, Gone)" (12" mix) – 3:34
"Space" – 5:13
" O.U. (Gone, Gone)" (radio edit) – 2:56

References

1992 singles
Pulp (band) songs
Songs written by Jarvis Cocker
Songs written by Candida Doyle
Songs written by Russell Senior
Songs written by Nick Banks
Songs written by Steve Mackey
1992 songs